The Mongol Empire of the 13th and 14th centuries was the largest contiguous land empire in history. Originating in present-day Mongolia in East Asia, the Mongol Empire at its height stretched from the Sea of Japan to parts of Eastern Europe, extending northward into parts of the Arctic; eastward and southward into parts of the Indian subcontinent, attempted invasions of Southeast Asia and conquered the Iranian Plateau; and westward as far as the Levant and the Carpathian Mountains.

The Mongol Empire emerged from the unification of several nomadic tribes in the Mongol homeland under the leadership of Temüjin, known by the more famous title of Genghis Khan (–1227), whom a council proclaimed as the ruler of all Mongols in 1206. The empire grew rapidly under his rule and that of his descendants, who sent out invading armies in every direction. The vast transcontinental empire connected the East with the West, and the Pacific to the Mediterranean, in an enforced Pax Mongolica, allowing the exchange of trade, technologies, commodities and ideologies across Eurasia.

The empire began to split due to wars over succession, as the grandchildren of Genghis Khan disputed whether the royal line should follow from his son and initial heir Ögedei or from one of his other sons, such as Tolui, Chagatai, or Jochi. The Toluids prevailed after a bloody purge of Ögedeid and Chagatayid factions, but disputes continued among the descendants of Tolui. A key reason for the split was the dispute over whether the Mongol Empire would become a sedentary, cosmopolitan empire, or would stay true to the Mongol nomadic and steppe-based lifestyle.

After Möngke Khan died (1259), rival kurultai councils simultaneously elected different successors, the brothers Ariq Böke and Kublai Khan, who fought each other in the Toluid Civil War (1260–1264) and also dealt with challenges from the descendants of other sons of Genghis. Kublai successfully took power, but war ensued as he sought unsuccessfully to regain control of the Chagatayid and Ögedeid families. By the time of Kublai's death in 1294, the Mongol Empire had fractured into four separate khanates or empires, each pursuing its own interests and objectives: the Golden Horde khanate in the northwest, the Chagatai Khanate in Central Asia, the Ilkhanate in the southwest, and the Yuan dynasty in the east, based in modern-day Beijing. In 1304, during the reign of Temür, the three western khanates accepted the suzerainty of the Yuan dynasty.

The part of the empire that fell first was the Ilkhanate, which disintegrated in the period of 1335–1353. Next, the Yuan dynasty lost control of Tibetan Plateau and China proper in 1354 and 1368 respectively, and collapsed after its capital of Dadu was taken over by Ming forces. The Genghisid rulers of the Yuan then retreated north and continued to rule the Mongolian Plateau. The regime is thereafter known as the Northern Yuan dynasty in historiography. The Golden Horde had broken into competing khanates by the end of the 15th century and was defeated and pushed out of Eastern Europe in 1480 by the Grand Duchy of Moscow, while the Chagatai Khanate lasted in one form or another until 1687.

Name 
The Mongol Empire referred to itself as  yeke Mongγol ulus ( 'nation of the great Mongols' or the 'great Mongol nation') in Mongol or kür uluγ ulus ( the 'whole great nation') in Turkic.

After the 1260 to 1264 succession war between Kublai Khan and his brother Ariq Böke, Kublai's power became limited to the eastern part of the empire, centred on China. Kublai officially issued an imperial edict on 18 December 1271 to name his realm Great Yuan (Dai Yuan, or Dai Ön Ulus) and to establish the Yuan dynasty. Some sources give the full Mongol name as Dai Ön Yehe Monggul Ulus.
(source:haibo ngaze ngabhoreka)

History

Pre-empire context 

The area around Mongolia, Manchuria, and parts of North China had been controlled by the Liao dynasty since the 10th century. In 1125, the Jin dynasty founded by the Jurchens overthrew the Liao dynasty and attempted to gain control over former Liao territory in Mongolia. In the 1130s the Jin dynasty rulers, known as the Golden Kings, successfully resisted the Khamag Mongol confederation, ruled at the time by Khabul Khan, great-grandfather of Genghis Khan.

The Mongolian plateau was occupied mainly by five powerful tribal confederations (khanlig): Keraites, Khamag Mongol, Naiman, Mergid, and Tatar. The Jin emperors, following a policy of divide and rule, encouraged disputes among the tribes, especially between the Tatars and the Mongols, in order to keep the nomadic tribes distracted by their own battles and thereby away from the Jin. Khabul's successor was Ambaghai Khan, who was betrayed by the Tatars, handed over to the Jurchen, and executed. The Mongols retaliated by raiding the frontier, resulting in a failed Jurchen counter-attack in 1143.

In 1147, the Jin somewhat changed their policy, signing a peace treaty with the Mongols and withdrawing from a score of forts. The Mongols then resumed attacks on the Tatars to avenge the death of their late khan, opening a long period of active hostilities. The Jin and Tatar armies defeated the Mongols in 1161.

During the rise of the Mongol Empire in the 13th century, the usually cold, parched steppes of Central Asia enjoyed their mildest, wettest conditions in more than a millennium. It is thought that this resulted in a rapid increase in the number of war horses and other livestock, which significantly enhanced Mongol military strength.

Rise of Genghis Khan 

Known during his childhood as Temüjin, Genghis Khan was a son of a Mongol chieftain. As a young man he rose very rapidly by working with Toghrul Khan of the Kerait. The most powerful Mongol leader at the time was Kurtait; he was given the Chinese title "Wang", which means King. Temujin went to war against Kurtait (now Wang Khan). After Temujin defeated Wang Khan he gave himself the name Genghis Khan. He then enlarged his Mongol state under himself and his kin. The term Mongol came to be used to refer to all Mongolic speaking tribes under the control of Genghis Khan. His most powerful allies were his father's friend, Khereid chieftain Toghrul, and Temujin's childhood anda (i.e. blood brother) Jamukha of the Jadran clan. With their help, Temujin defeated the Merkit tribe, rescued his wife Börte, and went on to defeat the Naimans and the Tatars.

Temujin forbade looting of his enemies without permission, and he implemented a policy of sharing spoils with his warriors and their families instead of giving it all to the aristocrats. These policies brought him into conflict with his uncles, who were also legitimate heirs to the throne; they regarded Temujin not as a leader but as an insolent usurper. This dissatisfaction spread to his generals and other associates, and some Mongols who had previously been allies broke their allegiance. War ensued, and Temujin and the forces still loyal to him prevailed, defeating the remaining rival tribes between 1203 and 1205 and bringing them under his sway. In 1206, Temujin was crowned as the khagan (Emperor) of the Yekhe Mongol Ulus (Great Mongol State) at a Kurultai (general assembly/council). It was there that he assumed the title of Genghis Khan (universal leader) instead of one of the old tribal titles such as Gur Khan or Tayang Khan, marking the start of the Mongol Empire.

Early organization 

Genghis Khan introduced many innovative ways of organizing his army: for example dividing it into decimal subsections of arbans (10 soldiers), zuuns (100), Mingghans (1000), and tumens (10,000). The Kheshig, the imperial guard, was founded and divided into day (khorchin torghuds) and night (khevtuul) guards. Genghis rewarded those who had been loyal to him and placed them in high positions, as heads of army units and households, even though many of them came from very low-ranking clans.

Compared to the units he gave to his loyal companions, those assigned to his own family members were relatively few. He proclaimed a new code of law of the empire, Ikh Zasag or Yassa; later he expanded it to cover much of the everyday life and political affairs of the nomads. He forbade the selling of women, theft, fighting among the Mongols, and the hunting of animals during the breeding season.

He appointed his stepbrother Shikhikhutug as supreme judge (jarughachi), ordering him to keep records of the empire. In addition to laws regarding family, food, and the army, Genghis also decreed religious freedom and supported domestic and international trade. He exempted the poor and the clergy from taxation. He also encouraged literacy and the adaptation of the Uyghur script into what would become the Mongolian script of the empire, ordering the Uyghur Tata-tonga, who had previously served the khan of Naimans, to instruct his sons.

Push into Central Asia 

Genghis quickly came into conflict with the Jin dynasty of the Jurchens and the Western Xia of the Tanguts in northern China. He also had to deal with two other powers, Tibet and Qara Khitai.

Before his death, Genghis Khan divided his empire among his sons and immediate family, making the Mongol Empire the joint property of the entire imperial family who, along with the Mongol aristocracy, constituted the ruling class.

Religious policies
Prior to the three western khanates' adoption of Islam, Genghis Khan and a number of his Yuan successors placed restrictions on religious practices they saw as alien. Muslims, including Hui, and Jews, were collectively referred to as Huihui. Muslims were forbidden from halal or zabiha butchering, while Jews were similarly forbidden from kashrut or shehita butchering. Referring to the conquered subjects as "our slaves," Genghis Khan demanded they no longer be able to refuse food or drink, and imposed restrictions on slaughter. Muslims had to slaughter sheep in secret.

Among all the [subject] alien peoples only the Hui-hui say "we do not eat Mongol food". [Cinggis Qa’an replied:] "By the aid of heaven we have pacified you; you are our slaves. Yet you do not eat our food or drink. How can this be right?" He thereupon made them eat. "If you slaughter sheep, you will be considered guilty of a crime." He issued a regulation to that effect ... [In 1279/1280 under Qubilai] all the Muslims say: "if someone else slaughters [the animal] we do not eat". Because the poor people are upset by this, from now on, Musuluman [Muslim] Huihui and Zhuhu [Jewish] Huihui, no matter who kills [the animal] will eat [it] and must cease slaughtering sheep themselves, and cease the rite of circumcision.

Genghis Khan arranged for the Chinese Taoist master Qiu Chuji to visit him in Afghanistan, and also gave his subjects the right to religious freedom, despite his own shamanistic beliefs.

Death of Genghis Khan and expansion under Ögedei (1227–1241) 

Genghis Khan died on 18 August 1227, by which time the Mongol Empire ruled from the Pacific Ocean to the Caspian Sea, an empire twice the size of the Roman Empire or the Muslim Caliphate at their height. Genghis named his third son, the charismatic Ögedei, as his heir. According to Mongol tradition, Genghis Khan was buried in a secret location. The regency was originally held by Ögedei's younger brother Tolui until Ögedei's formal election at the kurultai in 1229.

Among his first actions Ögedei sent troops to subjugate the Bashkirs, Bulgars, and other nations in the Kipchak-controlled steppes. In the east, Ögedei's armies re-established Mongol authority in Manchuria, crushing the Eastern Xia regime and the Water Tatars. In 1230, the great khan personally led his army in the campaign against the Jin dynasty of China. Ögedei's general Subutai captured the capital of Emperor Wanyan Shouxu in the siege of Kaifeng in 1232. The Jin dynasty collapsed in 1234 when the Mongols captured Caizhou, the town to which Wanyan Shouxu had fled. In 1234, three armies commanded by Ögedei's sons Kochu and Koten and the Tangut general Chagan invaded southern China. With the assistance of the Song dynasty the Mongols finished off the Jin in 1234.

Many Han Chinese and Khitan defected to the Mongols to fight against the Jin. Two Han Chinese leaders, Shi Tianze, Liu Heima (劉黑馬, Liu Ni), and the Khitan Xiao Zhala defected and commanded the 3 Tumens in the Mongol army. Liu Heima and Shi Tianze served Ogödei Khan. Liu Heima and Shi Tianxiang led armies against Western Xia for the Mongols. There were four Han Tumens and three Khitan Tumens, with each Tumen consisting of 10,000 troops. The Yuan dynasty created a Han army 漢軍 from Jin defectors, and another of ex-Song troops called the Newly Submitted Army 新附軍.

In the West Ögedei's general Chormaqan destroyed Jalal ad-Din Mingburnu, the last shah of the Khwarizmian Empire. The small kingdoms in southern Persia voluntarily accepted Mongol supremacy. In East Asia, there were a number of Mongol campaigns into Goryeo Korea, but Ögedei's attempt to annex the Korean Peninsula met with little success. Gojong, the king of Goryeo, surrendered but later revolted and massacred Mongol darughachis (overseers); he then moved his imperial court from Gaeseong to Ganghwa Island.

In 1235, the Mongols established Karakorum as their capital lasting until 1260. During that period, Ogedei Khan ordered the construction of a palace within the surrounding of its walls.

Invasions of Kievan Rus' and central China 

Meanwhile, in an offensive action against the Song dynasty, Mongol armies captured Siyang-yang, the Yangtze and Sichuan, but did not secure their control over the conquered areas. The Song generals were able to recapture Siyang-yang from the Mongols in 1239. After the sudden death of Ögedei's son Kochu in Chinese territory the Mongols withdrew from southern China, although Kochu's brother Prince Koten invaded Tibet immediately after their withdrawal.

Batu Khan, another grandson of Genghis Khan, overran the territories of the Bulgars, the Alans, the Kypchaks, Bashkirs, Mordvins, Chuvash, and other nations of the southern Russian steppe. By 1237 the Mongols were encroaching upon Ryazan, the first Kievan Rus' principality they were to attack. After a three-day siege involving fierce fighting, the Mongols captured the city and massacred its inhabitants. They then proceeded to destroy the army of the Grand Principality of Vladimir at the Battle of the Sit River.

The Mongols captured the Alania capital Maghas in 1238. By 1240, all Kievan Rus' had fallen to the Asian invaders except for a few northern cities. Mongol troops under Chormaqan in Persia connecting his invasion of Transcaucasia with the invasion of Batu and Subutai, forced the Georgian and Armenian nobles to surrender as well.

Giovanni de Plano Carpini, the pope's envoy to the Mongol great khan, travelled through Kiev in February 1246 and wrote:

Despite the military successes, strife continued within the Mongol ranks. Batu's relations with Güyük, Ögedei's eldest son, and Büri, the beloved grandson of Chagatai Khan, remained tense and worsened during Batu's victory banquet in southern Kievan Rus'. Nevertheless, Güyük and Buri could not do anything to harm Batu's position as long as his uncle Ögedei was still alive. Ögedei continued with offensives into the Indian subcontinent, temporarily investing Uchch, Lahore, and Multan of the Delhi Sultanate and stationing a Mongol overseer in Kashmir, though the invasions into India eventually failed and were forced to retreat. In northeastern Asia, Ögedei agreed to end the conflict with Goryeo by making it a client state and sent Mongol princesses to wed Goryeo princes. He then reinforced his kheshig with the Koreans through both diplomacy and military force.

Push into central Europe 

The advance into Europe continued with Mongol invasions of Poland and Hungary. When the western flank of the Mongols plundered Polish cities, a European alliance among the Poles, the Moravians, and the Christian military orders of the Hospitallers, Teutonic Knights and the Templars assembled sufficient forces to halt, although briefly, the Mongol advance at Legnica. The Hungarian army, their Croatian allies and the Knights Templar were beaten by the Mongols at the banks of the Sajo River on 11 April 1241. Before Batu's forces could continue on to Vienna and northern Albania, news of Ögedei's death in December 1241 brought a halt to the invasion. As was customary in Mongol military tradition, all princes of Genghis's line had to attend the kurultai to elect a successor. Batu and his western Mongol army withdrew from Central Europe the next year. Today researchers doubt that Ögedei's death was the sole reason for the Mongols withdrawal. Batu did not return to Mongolia, so a new khan was not elected until 1246. Climatic and environmental factors, as well as the strong fortifications and castles of Europe, played an important role in the Mongols' decision to withdraw.

Post-Ögedei power struggles (1241–1251) 
Following the Great Khan Ögedei's death in 1241, and before the next kurultai, Ögedei's widow Töregene took over the empire. She persecuted her husband's Khitan and Muslim officials and gave high positions to her own allies. She built palaces, cathedrals, and social structures on an imperial scale, supporting religion and education. She was able to win over most Mongol aristocrats to support Ögedei's son Güyük. But Batu, ruler of the Golden Horde, refused to come to the kurultai, claiming that he was ill and that the climate was too harsh for him. The resulting stalemate lasted more than four years and further destabilized the unity of the empire.

When Genghis Khan's youngest brother Temüge threatened to seize the throne, Güyük came to Karakorum to try to secure his position. Batu eventually agreed to send his brothers and generals to the kurultai convened by Töregene in 1246. Güyük by this time was ill and alcoholic, but his campaigns in Manchuria and Europe gave him the kind of stature necessary for a great khan. He was duly elected at a ceremony attended by Mongols and foreign dignitaries from both within and without the empire — leaders of vassal nations, representatives from Rome, and other entities who came to the kurultai to show their respects and conduct diplomacy.

Güyük took steps to reduce corruption, announcing that he would continue the policies of his father Ögedei, not those of Töregene. He punished Töregene's supporters, except for governor Arghun the Elder. He also replaced young Qara Hülëgü, the khan of the Chagatai Khanate, with his favorite cousin Yesü Möngke, to assert his newly conferred powers. He restored his father's officials to their former positions and was surrounded by Uyghur, Naiman and Central Asian officials, favoring Han Chinese commanders who had helped his father conquer Northern China. He continued military operations in Korea, advanced into Song China in the south, and into Iraq in the west, and ordered an empire-wide census. Güyük also divided the Sultanate of Rum between Izz-ad-Din Kaykawus and Rukn ad-Din Kilij Arslan, though Kaykawus disagreed with this decision.

Not all parts of the empire respected Güyük's election. The Hashshashins, former Mongol allies whose Grand Master Hasan Jalalud-Din had offered his submission to Genghis Khan in 1221, angered Güyük by refusing to submit. Instead he murdered the Mongol generals in Persia. Güyük appointed his best friend's father Eljigidei as chief commander of the troops in Persia and gave them the task of both reducing the strongholds of the Nizari Ismailis and conquering the Abbasids at the center of the Islamic world, Iran and Iraq.

Death of Güyük (1248) 
In 1248, Güyük raised more troops and suddenly marched westward from the Mongol capital of Karakorum. The reasoning was unclear. Some sources wrote that he sought to recuperate at his personal estate, Emyl; others suggested that he might have been moving to join Eljigidei to conduct a full-scale conquest of the Middle East, or possibly to make a surprise attack on his rival cousin Batu Khan in Rus.

Suspicious of Güyük's motives, Sorghaghtani Beki, the widow of Genghis's son Tolui, secretly warned her nephew Batu of Güyük's approach. Batu had himself been traveling eastward at the time, possibly to pay homage, or perhaps with other plans in mind. Before the forces of Batu and Güyük met, Güyük, sick and worn out by travel, died en route at Qum-Senggir (Hong-siang-yi-eulh) in Xinjiang, possibly a victim of poison.

Güyük's widow Oghul Qaimish stepped forward to take control of the empire, but she lacked the skills of her mother-in-law Töregene, and her young sons Khoja and Naku and other princes challenged her authority. To decide on a new great khan, Batu called a kurultai on his own territory in 1250. As it was far from the Mongol heartland, members of the Ögedeid and Chagataid families refused to attend. The kurultai offered the throne to Batu, but he rejected it, claiming he had no interest in the position. Batu instead nominated Möngke, a grandson of Genghis from his son Tolui's lineage. Möngke was leading a Mongol army in Rus, the northern Caucasus and Hungary. The pro-Tolui faction supported Batu's choice, and Möngke was elected; though given the kurultai's limited attendance and location, it was of questionable validity.

Batu sent Möngke, under the protection of his brothers, Berke and Tukhtemur, and his son Sartaq to assemble a more formal kurultai at Kodoe Aral in the heartland. The supporters of Möngke repeatedly invited Oghul Qaimish and the other major Ögedeid and Chagataid princes to attend the kurultai, but they refused each time. The Ögedeid and Chagataid princes refused to accept a descendant of Genghis's son Tolui as leader, demanding that only descendants of Genghis's son Ögedei could be great khan.

Rule of Möngke Khan (1251–1259)

When Möngke's mother Sorghaghtani and their cousin Berke organized a second kurultai on 1 July 1251, the assembled throng proclaimed Möngke great khan of the Mongol Empire. This marked a major shift in the leadership of the empire, transferring power from the descendants of Genghis's son Ögedei to the descendants of Genghis's son Tolui. The decision was acknowledged by a few of the Ögedeid and Chagataid princes, such as Möngke's cousin Kadan and the deposed khan Qara Hülëgü, but one of the other legitimate heirs, Ögedei's grandson Shiremun, sought to topple Möngke.

Shiremun moved with his own forces toward the emperor's nomadic palace with a plan for an armed attack, but Möngke was alerted by his falconer of the plan. Möngke ordered an investigation of the plot, which led to a series of major trials all across the empire. Many members of the Mongol elite were found guilty and put to death, with estimates ranging from 77 to 300, though princes of Genghis's royal line were often exiled rather than executed.

Möngke confiscated the estates of the Ögedeid and the Chagatai families and shared the western part of the empire with his ally Batu Khan. After the bloody purge, Möngke ordered a general amnesty for prisoners and captives, but thereafter the power of the great khan's throne remained firmly with the descendants of Tolui.

Administrative reforms
Möngke was a serious man who followed the laws of his ancestors and avoided alcoholism. He was tolerant of outside religions and artistic styles, leading to the building of foreign merchants' quarters, Buddhist monasteries, mosques, and Christian churches in the Mongol capital. As construction projects continued, Karakorum was adorned with Chinese, European, and Persian architecture. One famous example was a large silver tree with cleverly designed pipes that dispensed various drinks. The tree, topped by a triumphant angel, was crafted by Guillaume Boucher, a Parisian goldsmith.

Although he had a strong Chinese contingent, Möngke relied heavily on Muslim and Mongol administrators and launched a series of economic reforms to make government expenses more predictable. His court limited government spending and prohibited nobles and troops from abusing civilians or issuing edicts without authorization. He commuted the contribution system to a fixed poll tax which was collected by imperial agents and forwarded to units in need. His court also tried to lighten the tax burden on commoners by reducing tax rates. He also centralized control of monetary affairs and reinforced the guards at the postal relays. Möngke ordered an empire-wide census in 1252 that took several years to complete and was not finished until Novgorod in the far northwest was counted in 1258.

In another move to consolidate his power, Möngke assigned his brothers Hulagu and Kublai to rule Persia and Mongol-held China respectively. In the southern part of the empire he continued his predecessors' struggle against the Song dynasty. In order to outflank the Song from three directions, Möngke dispatched Mongol armies under his brother Kublai to Yunnan, and under his uncle Iyeku to subdue Korea and pressure the Song from that direction as well.

Kublai conquered the Dali Kingdom in 1253 after the Dali King Duan Xingzhi defected to the Mongols and helped them conquer the rest of Yunnan. Möngke's general Qoridai stabilized his control over Tibet, inducing leading monasteries to submit to Mongol rule. Subutai's son Uryankhadai reduced the neighboring peoples of Yunnan to submission and went to war with the kingdom of Đại Việt under the Trần dynasty in northern Vietnam in 1258, but they had to draw back. The Mongol Empire tried to invade Đại Việt again in 1285 and 1287 but were defeated both times.

New invasions of the Middle East and Southern China 

After stabilizing the empire's finances, Möngke once again sought to expand its borders. At kurultais in Karakorum in 1253 and 1258 he approved new invasions of the Middle East and south China. Möngke put Hulagu in overall charge of military and civil affairs in Persia, and appointed Chagataids and Jochids to join Hulagu's army.

The Muslims from Qazvin denounced the menace of the Nizari Ismailis, a well-known sect of Shiites. The Mongol Naiman commander Kitbuqa began to assault several Ismaili fortresses in 1253, before Hulagu advanced in 1256. Ismaili Grand Master Rukn al-Din Khurshah surrendered in 1257 and was executed. All of the Ismaili strongholds in Persia were destroyed by Hulagu's army in 1257, except for Girdkuh which held out until 1271.

The center of the Islamic Empire at the time was Baghdad, which had held power for 500 years but was suffering internal divisions. When its caliph al-Mustasim refused to submit to the Mongols, Baghdad was besieged and captured by the Mongols in 1258 and subjected to a merciless sack, an event considered one of the most catastrophic events in the history of Islam, and sometimes compared to the rupture of the Kaaba. With the destruction of the Abbasid Caliphate, Hulagu had an open route to Syria and moved against the other Muslim powers in the region.

His army advanced toward Ayyubid-ruled Syria, capturing small local states en route. The sultan Al-Nasir Yusuf of the Ayyubids refused to show himself before Hulagu; however, he had accepted Mongol supremacy two decades earlier. When Hulagu headed further west, the Armenians from Cilicia, the Seljuks from Rum and the Christian realms of Antioch and Tripoli submitted to Mongol authority, joining them in their assault against the Muslims. While some cities surrendered without resisting, others, such as Mayafarriqin fought back; their populations were massacred and the cities were sacked.

Death of Möngke Khan (1259)
Meanwhile, in the northwestern portion of the empire, Batu's successor and younger brother Berke sent punitive expeditions to Ukraine, Belarus, Lithuania and Poland. Dissension began brewing between the northwestern and southwestern sections of the Mongol Empire as Batu suspected that Hulagu's invasion of Western Asia would result in the elimination of Batu's own dominance there.

In the southern part of the empire, Möngke Khan himself led his army, but did not complete the conquest of China. Military operations were generally successful, but prolonged, so the forces did not withdraw to the north as was customary when the weather turned hot. Disease ravaged the Mongol forces with bloody epidemics, and Möngke died there on 11 August 1259. This event began a new chapter in the history of the Mongols, as again a decision needed to be made on a new great khan. Mongol armies across the empire withdrew from their campaigns to convene a new kurultai.

Disunity

Dispute over succession

Möngke's brother Hulagu broke off his successful military advance into Syria, withdrawing the bulk of his forces to Mughan and leaving only a small contingent under his general Kitbuqa. The opposing forces in the region, the Christian Crusaders and Muslim Mamluks, both recognizing that the Mongols were the greater threat, took advantage of the weakened state of the Mongol army and engaged in an unusual passive truce with each other.

In 1260, the Mamluks advanced from Egypt, being allowed to camp and resupply near the Christian stronghold of Acre, and engaged Kitbuqa's forces just north of Galilee at the Battle of Ain Jalut. The Mongols were defeated, and Kitbuqa executed. This pivotal battle marked the western limit for Mongol expansion in the Middle East, and the Mongols were never again able to make serious military advances farther than Syria.

In a separate part of the empire, Kublai Khan, another brother of Hulagu and Möngke, heard of the great khan's death at the Huai River in China. Rather than returning to the capital, he continued his advance into the Wuchang area of China, near the Yangtze River. Their younger brother Ariqboke took advantage of the absence of Hulagu and Kublai, and used his position at the capital to win the title of great khan for himself, with representatives of all the family branches proclaiming him as the leader at the kurultai in Karakorum. When Kublai learned of this, he summoned his own kurultai at Kaiping, and nearly all the senior princes and great noyans in North China and Manchuria supported his own candidacy over that of Ariqboke.

Mongol Civil War

Battles ensued between the armies of Kublai and those of his brother Ariqboke, which included forces still loyal to Möngke's previous administration. Kublai's army easily eliminated Ariqboke's supporters and seized control of the civil administration in southern Mongolia. Further challenges took place from their cousins, the Chagataids. Kublai sent Abishka, a Chagataid prince loyal to him, to take charge of Chagatai's realm. But Ariqboke captured and then executed Abishka, having his own man Alghu crowned there instead. Kublai's new administration blockaded Ariqboke in Mongolia to cut off food supplies, causing a famine. Karakorum fell quickly to Kublai, but Ariqboke rallied and re-took the capital in 1261.

In southwestern Ilkhanate, Hulagu was loyal to his brother Kublai, but clashes with their cousin Berke, a Muslim and the ruler of the Golden Horde, began in 1262. The suspicious deaths of Jochid princes in Hulagu's service, unequal distribution of war booty, and Hulagu's massacres of Muslims increased the anger of Berke, who considered supporting a rebellion of the Georgian Kingdom against Hulagu's rule in 1259–1260. Berke also forged an alliance with the Egyptian Mamluks against Hulagu and supported Kublai's rival claimant, Ariqboke.

Hulagu died on 8 February 1264. Berke sought to take advantage and invade Hulagu's realm, but he died along the way, and a few months later Alghu Khan of the Chagatai Khanate died as well. Kublai named Hulagu's son Abaqa as new Ilkhan, and nominated Batu's grandson Möngke Temür to lead the Golden Horde. Abaqa sought foreign alliances, such as attempting to form a Franco-Mongol alliance against the Egyptian Mamluks. Ariqboqe surrendered to Kublai at Shangdu on 21 August 1264.

Campaigns of Kublai Khan (1264–1294) 

In the south, after the fall of Xiangyang in 1273, the Mongols sought the final conquest of the Song dynasty in South China. In 1271, Kublai renamed the new Mongol regime in China as the Yuan dynasty and sought to sinicize his image as Emperor of China to win the control of the Chinese people. Kublai moved his headquarters to Khanbaliq, the genesis for what later became the modern city of Beijing. His establishment of a capital there was a controversial move to many Mongols who accused him of being too closely tied to Chinese culture.

The Mongols were eventually successful in their campaigns against (Song) China, and the Chinese Song imperial family surrendered to the Yuan in 1276, making the Mongols the first non-Chinese people to conquer all of China. Kublai used his base to build a powerful empire, creating an academy, offices, trade ports and canals, and sponsoring arts and science. Mongol records list 20,166 public schools created during his reign.

After achieving actual or nominal dominion over much of Eurasia and successfully conquering China, Kublai pursued further expansion. His invasions of Burma and Sakhalin were costly, and his attempted invasions of Đại Việt (northern Vietnam) and Champa (southern Vietnam) ended in devastating defeat, but secured vassal statuses of those countries. The Mongol armies were repeatedly beaten in Đại Việt and were crushed at the Battle of Bạch Đằng (1288).

Nogai and Konchi, the khan of the White Horde, established friendly relations with the Yuan dynasty and the Ilkhanate. Political disagreement among contending branches of the family over the office of great khan continued, but the economic and commercial success of the Mongol Empire continued despite the squabbling.

In 1274 and again in 1281, Kublai Khan invaded Japan on two separate occasions. However, he was not able to conquer Japan.

Disintegration into competing entities 

Major changes occurred in the Mongol Empire in the late 1200s. Kublai Khan, after having conquered all of China and established the Yuan dynasty, died in 1294. He was succeeded by his grandson Temür Khan, who continued Kublai's policies. At the same time the Toluid Civil War, along with the Berke–Hulagu war and the subsequent Kaidu–Kublai war, greatly weakened the authority of the great khan over the entirety of the Mongol Empire and the empire fractured into autonomous khanates, the Yuan dynasty and the three western khanates: the Golden Horde, the Chagatai Khanate and the Ilkhanate. Only the Ilkhanate remained loyal to the Yuan court but endured its own power struggle, in part because of a dispute with the growing Islamic factions within the southwestern part of the empire.

After the death of Kaidu, the Chatagai ruler Duwa initiated a peace proposal and persuaded the Ögedeids to submit to Temür Khan. In 1304, all of the khanates approved a peace treaty and accepted Yuan emperor Temür's supremacy. This established the nominal supremacy of the Yuan dynasty over the western khanates, which was to last for several decades. This supremacy was based on weaker foundations than that of the earlier Khagans and each of the four khanates continued to develop separately and function as independent states.

Nearly a century of conquest and civil war was followed by relative stability, the Pax Mongolica, and international trade and cultural exchanges flourished between Asia and Europe. Communication between the Yuan dynasty in China and the Ilkhanate in Persia further encouraged trade and commerce between east and west. Patterns of Yuan royal textiles could be found on the opposite side of the empire adorning Armenian decorations; trees and vegetables were transplanted across the empire; and technological innovations spread from Mongol dominions toward the West. Pope John XXII was presented a memorandum from the eastern church describing the Pax Mongolica: "... Khagan is one of the greatest monarchs and all lords of the state, e.g., the king of Almaligh (Chagatai Khanate), emperor Abu Said and Uzbek Khan, are his subjects, saluting his holiness to pay their respects." However, while the four khanates continued to interact with one another well into the 14th century, they did so as sovereign states and never again pooled their resources in a cooperative military endeavor.

Development of the khanates 

In spite of his conflicts with Kaidu and Duwa, Yuan emperor Temür established a tributary relationship with the war-like Shan people after his series of military operations against Thailand from 1297 to 1303. This was to mark the end of the southern expansion of the Mongols.

When Ghazan took the throne of the Ilkhanate in 1295, he formally accepted Islam as his own religion, marking a turning point in Mongol history after which Mongol Persia became more and more Islamic. Despite this, Ghazan continued to strengthen ties with Temür Khan and the Yuan dynasty in the east. It was politically useful to advertise the great khan's authority in the Ilkhanate, because the Golden Horde in Rus had long made claims on nearby Georgia. Within four years, Ghazan began sending tribute to the Yuan court and appealing to other khans to accept Temür Khan as their overlord. He oversaw an extensive program of cultural and scientific interaction between the Ilkhanate and the Yuan dynasty in the following decades.

Ghazan's faith may have been Islamic, but he continued his ancestors' war with the Egyptian Mamluks, and consulted with his old Mongol advisers in his native tongue. He defeated the Mamluk army at the Battle of Wadi al-Khazandar in 1299, but he was only briefly able to occupy Syria, due to distracting raids from the Chagatai Khanate under its de facto ruler Kaidu, who was at war with both the Ilkhans and the Yuan dynasty.

Struggling for influence within the Golden Horde, Kaidu sponsored his own candidate Kobeleg against Bayan (r. 1299–1304), the khan of the White Horde. Bayan, after receiving military support from the Mongols in Rus, requested assistance from both Temür Khan and the Ilkhanate to organize a unified attack against Kaidu's forces. Temür was amenable and attacked Kaidu a year later. After a bloody battle with Temür's armies near the Zawkhan River in 1301, Kaidu died and was succeeded by Duwa.

Duwa was challenged by Kaidu's son Chapar, but with the assistance of Temür, Duwa defeated the Ögedeids. Tokhta of the Golden Horde, also seeking a general peace, sent 20,000 men to buttress the Yuan frontier. Tokhta died in 1312, though, and was succeeded by Ozbeg (r. 1313–41), who seized the throne of the Golden Horde and persecuted non-Muslim Mongols. The Yuan's influence on the Horde was largely reversed and border clashes between Mongol states resumed. Ayurbarwada Buyantu Khan's envoys backed Tokhta's son against Ozbeg.

In the Chagatai Khanate, Esen Buqa I (r. 1309–1318) was enthroned as khan after suppressing a sudden rebellion by Ögedei's descendants and driving Chapar into exile. The Yuan and Ilkhanid armies eventually attacked the Chagatai Khanate. Recognising the potential economic benefits and the Genghisid legacy, Ozbeg reopened friendly relations with the Yuan in 1326. He strengthened ties with the Muslim world as well, building mosques and other elaborate structures such as baths. By the second decade of the 14th century, Mongol invasions had further decreased. In 1323, Abu Said Khan (r. 1316–35) of the Ilkhanate signed a peace treaty with Egypt. At his request, the Yuan court awarded his custodian Chupan the title of commander-in-chief of all Mongol khanates, but Chupan died in late 1327.

Civil war erupted in the Yuan dynasty in 1328–29. After the death of Yesün Temür in 1328, Tugh Temür became the new leader in Khanbaliq, while Yesün Temür's son Ragibagh succeeded to the throne in Shangdu, leading to the civil war known as the War of the Two Capitals. Tugh Temür defeated Ragibagh, but the Chagatai khan Eljigidey (r. 1326–29) supported Kusala, elder brother of Tugh Temür, as great khan. He invaded with a commanding force, and Tugh Temür abdicated. Kusala was elected khan on 30 August 1329. Kusala was then poisoned by a Kypchak commander under Tugh Temür, who returned to power.

Tugh Temür (1304–32) was knowledgeable about Chinese language and history and was also a creditable poet, calligrapher, and painter. In order to be accepted by other khanates as the sovereign of the Mongol world, he sent Genghisid princes and descendants of notable Mongol generals to the Chagatai Khanate, Ilkhan Abu Said, and Ozbeg. In response to the emissaries, they all agreed to send tribute each year. Furthermore, Tugh Temür gave lavish presents and an imperial seal to Eljigidey to mollify his anger.

Rump states of the Mongol Empire 

With the death of Ilkhan Abu Said Bahatur in 1335, Mongol rule faltered and Persia fell into political anarchy. A year later his successor was killed by an Oirat governor, and the Ilkhanate was divided between the Suldus, the Jalayir, Qasarid Togha Temür (d. 1353), and Persian warlords. Taking advantage of the chaos, the Georgians pushed the Mongols out of their territory, and the Uyghur commander Eretna established an independent state (Eretnids) in Anatolia in 1336. Following the downfall of their Mongol masters, the loyal vassal, the Armenian Kingdom of Cilicia, received escalating threats from the Mamluks and were eventually overrun in 1375.
Along with the dissolution of the Ilkhanate in Persia, Mongol rulers in China and the Chagatai Khanate were also in turmoil. The plague known as the Black Death, which started in the Mongol dominions and spread to Europe, added to the confusion. Disease devastated all the khanates, cutting off commercial ties and killing millions. The plague may have taken 50 million lives in Europe alone in the 14th century.

As the power of the Mongols declined, chaos erupted throughout the empire as non-Mongol leaders expanded their own influence. The Golden Horde lost all of its western dominions (including modern Belarus and Ukraine) to Poland and Lithuania between 1342 and 1369. Muslim and non-Muslim princes in the Chagatai Khanate warred with each other from 1331 to 1343, and the Chagatai Khanate disintegrated when non-Genghisid warlords set up their own puppet khans in Transoxiana and Moghulistan. Janibeg Khan (r. 1342–1357) briefly reasserted Jochid dominance over the Chaghataids. Demanding submission from an offshoot of the Ilkhanate in Azerbaijan, he boasted that "today three uluses are under my control".

However, rival families of the Jochids began fighting for the throne of the Golden Horde after the assassination of his successor Berdibek Khan in 1359. The last Yuan ruler Toghan Temür (r. 1333–70) was powerless to regulate those troubles, a sign that the empire had nearly reached its end. His court's unbacked currency had entered a hyperinflationary spiral and the Han-Chinese people revolted due to the Yuan's harsh impositions. In the 1350s, Gongmin of Goryeo successfully pushed Mongol garrisons back and exterminated the family of Toghan Temür Khan's empress while Tai Situ Changchub Gyaltsen managed to eliminate the Mongol influence in Tibet.

Increasingly isolated from their subjects, the Mongols quickly lost most of China to the rebellious Ming forces and in 1368 fled to their heartland in Mongolia. After the overthrow of the Yuan dynasty the Golden Horde lost touch with Mongolia and China, while the two main parts of the Chagatai Khanate were defeated by Timur (Tamerlane) (1336–1405), who founded the Timurid Empire. However, remnants of the Chagatai Khanate survived; the last Chagataid state to survive was the Yarkent Khanate, until its defeat by the Oirat Dzungar Khanate in the Dzungar conquest of Altishahr in 1680. The Golden Horde broke into smaller Turkic-hordes that declined steadily in power over four centuries. Among them, the khanate's shadow, the Great Horde, survived until 1502, when one of its successors, the Crimean Khanate, sacked Sarai. The Crimean Khanate lasted until 1783, whereas khanates such as the Khanate of Bukhara and the Kazakh Khanate lasted even longer.

Military organization 

The number of troops mustered by the Mongols is the subject of some scholarly debate, but was at least 105,000 in 1206. The Mongol military organization was simple but effective, based on the decimal system. The army was built up from squads of ten men each, arbans (10 people), zuuns (100), Mingghans (1000), and tumens (10,000).

The Mongols were most famous for their horse archers, but troops armed with lances were equally skilled, and the Mongols recruited other military specialists from the lands they conquered. With experienced Chinese engineers and a bombardier corps which was expert at building trebuchets, catapults and other machines, the Mongols could lay siege to fortified positions, sometimes building machinery on the spot using available local resources.

Forces under the command of the Mongol Empire were trained, organized, and equipped for mobility and speed. Mongol soldiers were more lightly armored than many of the armies they faced but were able to make up for it with maneuverability. Each Mongol warrior would usually travel with multiple horses, allowing him to quickly switch to a fresh mount as needed. In addition, soldiers of the Mongol army functioned independently of supply lines, considerably speeding up army movement. Skillful use of couriers enabled the leaders of these armies to maintain contact with each other.

Discipline was inculcated during a nerge (traditional hunt), as reported by Juvayni. These hunts were distinctive from hunts in other cultures, being the equivalent to small unit actions. Mongol forces would spread out in a line, surround an entire region, and then drive all of the game within that area together. The goal was to let none of the animals escape and to slaughter them all.

Another advantage of the Mongols was their ability to traverse large distances, even in unusually cold winters; for instance, frozen rivers led them like highways to large urban centers on their banks. The Mongols were adept at river-work, crossing the river Sajó in spring flood conditions with thirty thousand cavalry soldiers in a single night during the Battle of Mohi (April 1241) to defeat the Hungarian king Béla IV. Similarly, in the attack against the Muslim Khwarezmshah a flotilla of barges was used to prevent escape on the river.

Traditionally known for their prowess with ground forces, the Mongols rarely used naval power. In the 1260s and 1270s they used seapower while conquering the Song dynasty of China, though their attempts to mount seaborne campaigns against Japan were unsuccessful. Around the Eastern Mediterranean, their campaigns were almost exclusively land-based, with the seas controlled by the Crusader and Mamluk forces.

All military campaigns were preceded by careful planning, reconnaissance, and the gathering of sensitive information relating to enemy territories and forces. The success, organization, and mobility of the Mongol armies permitted them to fight on several fronts at once. All adult males up to the age of 60 were eligible for conscription into the army, a source of honor in their tribal warrior tradition.

Society

Law and governance 

The Mongol Empire was governed by a code of law devised by Genghis, called Yassa, meaning "order" or "decree". A particular canon of this code was that those of rank shared much the same hardship as the common man. It also imposed severe penalties, e.g., the death penalty if one mounted soldier following another did not pick up something dropped from the mount in front. Penalties were also decreed for rape and to some extent for murder. Any resistance to Mongol rule was met with massive collective punishment. Cities were destroyed and their inhabitants slaughtered if they defied Mongol orders. Under Yassa, chiefs and generals were selected based on merit. The empire was governed by a non-democratic, parliamentary-style central assembly, called kurultai, in which the Mongol chiefs met with the great khan to discuss domestic and foreign policies. Kurultais were also convened for the selection of each new great khan.

Genghis Khan also created a national seal, encouraged the use of a written alphabet in Mongolia, and exempted teachers, lawyers, and artists from taxes.

The Mongols imported Central Asian Muslims to serve as administrators in China and sent Han Chinese and Khitans from China to serve as administrators over the Muslim population in Bukhara in Central Asia, thus using foreigners to curtail the power of the local peoples of both lands. The Mongols were tolerant of other religions, and rarely persecuted people on religious grounds. This was associated with their culture and progressive thought. Some historians of the 20th century thought this was a good military strategy: when Genghis was at war with Sultan Muhammad of Khwarezm, other Islamic leaders did not join the fight, as it was seen as a non-holy war between two individual powers.

Religions 

At the time of Genghis Khan, virtually every religion had found Mongol converts, from Buddhism to Christianity, from Manichaeism to Islam. To avoid strife, Genghis Khan set up an institution that ensured complete religious freedom, though he himself was a shamanist. Under his administration, all religious leaders were exempt from taxation and from public service.

Initially there were few formal places of worship because of the nomadic lifestyle. However, under Ögedei (1186–1241), several building projects were undertaken in the Mongol capital. Along with palaces, Ögedei built houses of worship for the Buddhist, Muslim, Christian, and Taoist followers. The dominant religions at that time were Tengrism and Buddhism, although Ögedei's wife was a Nestorian Christian.

Eventually, each of the successor states adopted the dominant religion of the local populations: the Mongol-ruled Chinese Yuan dynasty in the East (originally the Great Khan's domain) embraced Buddhism and Shamanism, while the three Western khanates adopted Islam.

Arts and literature 

The oldest surviving literary work in the Mongolian language is The Secret History of the Mongols, which was written for the royal family some time after Genghis Khan's death in 1227. It is the most significant native account of Genghis's life and genealogy, covering his origins and childhood through to the establishment of the Mongol Empire and the reign of his son, Ögedei.

Another classic from the empire is the Jami' al-tawarikh, or "Universal History". It was commissioned in the early 14th century by the Ilkhan Abaqa Khan as a way of documenting the entire world's history, to help establish the Mongols' own cultural legacy.

Mongol scribes in the 14th century used a mixture of resin and vegetable pigments as a primitive form of correction fluid; this is arguably its first known usage.

The Mongols also appreciated the visual arts, though their taste in portraiture was strictly focused on portraits of their horses, rather than of people.

Science 

The Mongol Empire saw some significant developments in science due to the patronage of the Khans. Roger Bacon attributed the success of the Mongols as world conquerors principally to their devotion to mathematics. Astronomy was one branch of science that the Khans took a personal interest in. According to the Yuanshi, Ögedei Khan twice ordered the armillary sphere of Zhongdu to be repaired (in 1233 and 1236) and also ordered in 1234 the revision and adoption of the Damingli calendar. He built a Confucian temple for Yelü Chucai in Karakorum around 1236 where Yelü Chucai created and regulated a calendar on the Chinese model. Möngke Khan was noted by Rashid al-Din as having solved some of the difficult problems of Euclidean geometry on his own and written to his brother Hulagu Khan to send him the astronomer Tusi. Möngke Khan's desire to have Tusi build him an observatory in Karakorum did not reach fruition as the Khan died on campaign in southern China. Hulagu Khan instead gave Tusi a grant to build the Maragheh Observatory in Persia in 1259 and ordered him to prepare astronomical tables for him in 12 years, despite Tusi asking for 30 years. Tusi successfully produced the Ilkhanic Tables in 12 years, produced a revised edition of Euclid's elements and taught the innovative mathematical device called the Tusi couple. The Maragheh Observatory held around 400,000 books salvaged by Tusi from the siege of Baghdad and other cities. Chinese astronomers brought by Hulagu Khan worked there as well.

Kublai Khan built a number of large observatories in China and his libraries included the Wu-hu-lie-ti (Euclid) brought by Muslim mathematicians. Zhu Shijie and Guo Shoujing were notable mathematicians in Yuan China. The Mongol physician Hu Sihui described the importance of a healthy diet in a 1330 medical treatise.

Ghazan Khan, able to understand four languages including Latin, built the Tabriz Observatory in 1295. The Byzantine Greek astronomer Gregory Chioniades studied there under Ajall Shams al-Din Omar who had worked at Maragheh under Tusi. Chioniades played an important role in transmitting several innovations from the Islamic world to Europe. These include the introduction of the universal latitude-independent astrolabe to Europe and a Greek description of the Tusi-couple, which would later have an influence on Copernican heliocentrism. Choniades also translated several Zij treatises into Greek, including the Persian Zij-i Ilkhani by al-Tusi and the Maragheh observatory. The Byzantine-Mongol alliance and the fact that the Empire of Trebizond was an Ilkhanate vassal facilitated Choniades' movements between Constantinople, Trebizond and Tabriz. Prince Radna, the Mongol viceroy of Tibet based in Gansu province, patronized the Samarkandi astronomer al-Sanjufini. The Arabic astronomical handbook dedicated by al-Sanjufini to Prince Radna, a descendant of Kublai Khan, was completed in 1363. It is notable for having Middle Mongolian glosses on its margins.

Mail system 

The Mongol Empire had an ingenious and efficient mail system for the time, often referred to by scholars as the Yam. It had lavishly furnished and well-guarded relay posts known as örtöö set up throughout the Empire. A messenger would typically travel  from one station to the next, either receiving a fresh, rested horse, or relaying the mail to the next rider to ensure the speediest possible delivery. The relay stations had attached households to service them. Anyone with a paiza was allowed to stop there for re-mounts and specified rations, while those carrying military identities used the Yam even without a paiza. Many merchants, messengers, and travelers from China, the Middle East, and Europe used the system. When the great khan died in Karakorum, news reached the Mongol forces under Batu Khan in Central Europe within 4–6 weeks thanks to the Yam.

Genghis and his successor Ögedei built a wide system of roads, one of which carved through the Altai mountains. After his enthronement, Ögedei further expanded the road system, ordering the Chagatai Khanate and Golden Horde to link up roads in western parts of the Mongol Empire.

Kublai Khan, founder of the Yuan dynasty, built special relays for high officials, as well as ordinary relays, that had hostels. During Kublai's reign, the Yuan communication system consisted of some 1,400 postal stations, which used 50,000 horses, 8,400 oxen, 6,700 mules, 4,000 carts, and 6,000 boats.

In Manchuria and southern Siberia, the Mongols still used dogsled relays for the Yam. In the Ilkhanate, Ghazan restored the declining relay system in the Middle East on a restricted scale. He constructed some hostels and decreed that only imperial envoys could receive a stipend. The Jochids of the Golden Horde financed their relay system by a special Yam tax.

Silk Road 

The Mongols had a history of supporting merchants and trade. Genghis Khan had encouraged foreign merchants early in his career, even before uniting the Mongols. Merchants provided information about neighboring cultures, served as diplomats and official traders for the Mongols, and were essential for many goods, since the Mongols produced little of their own.

Mongol government and elites provided capital for merchants and sent them far afield, in an ortoq (merchant partner) arrangement. In Mongol times, the contractual features of a Mongol-ortoq partnership closely resembled that of qirad and commenda arrangements, however, Mongol investors were not constrained using uncoined precious metals and tradable goods for partnership investments and primarily financed money-lending and trade activities. Moreover, Mongol elites formed trade partnerships with merchants from Italian cities, including Marco Polo’s family. As the empire grew, any merchants or ambassadors with proper documentation and authorization received protection and sanctuary as they traveled through Mongol realms. Well-traveled and relatively well-maintained roads linked lands from the Mediterranean basin to China, greatly increasing overland trade and resulting in some dramatic stories of those who travelled through what would become known as the Silk Road.

Western explorer Marco Polo traveled east along the Silk Road, and the Chinese Mongol monk Rabban Bar Sauma made a comparably epic journey along the route, venturing from his home of Khanbaliq (Beijing) as far as Europe. European missionaries, such as William of Rubruck, also traveled to the Mongol court to convert believers to their cause, or went as papal envoys to correspond with Mongol rulers in an attempt to secure a Franco-Mongol alliance. It was rare, however, for anyone to journey the full length of Silk Road. Instead, merchants moved products like a bucket brigade, goods being traded from one middleman to another, moving from China all the way to the West; the goods moved over such long distances fetched extravagant prices.

After Genghis, the merchant partner business continued to flourish under his successors Ögedei and Güyük. Merchants brought clothing, food, information, and other provisions to the imperial palaces, and in return the great khans gave the merchants tax exemptions and allowed them to use the official relay stations of the Mongol Empire. Merchants also served as tax farmers in China, Rus and Iran. If the merchants were attacked by bandits, losses were made up from the imperial treasury.

Policies changed under the Great Khan Möngke. Because of money laundering and overtaxing, he attempted to limit abuses and sent imperial investigators to supervise the ortoq businesses. He decreed that all merchants must pay commercial and property taxes, and he paid off all drafts drawn by high-ranking Mongol elites from the merchants. This policy continued under the Yuan dynasty.

The fall of the Mongol Empire in the 14th century led to the collapse of the political, cultural, and economic unity along the Silk Road. Turkic tribes seized the western end of the route from the Byzantine Empire, sowing the seeds of a Turkic culture that would later crystallize into the Ottoman Empire under the Sunni faith. In the East, the Han Chinese overthrew the Yuan dynasty in 1368, launching their own Ming dynasty and pursuing a policy of economic isolationism.

Legacy 

The Mongol Empire, at its height of the largest contiguous empire in history, had a lasting impact, unifying large regions. Some of these (such as eastern and western Russia, and the western parts of China) remain unified today. Mongols might have been assimilated into local populations after the fall of the empire, and some of their descendants adopted local religions. For example, the eastern khanate largely adopted Buddhism, and the three western khanates adopted Islam, largely under Sufi influence.

According to some interpretations, Genghis Khan's conquests caused wholesale destruction on an unprecedented scale in certain geographic regions, leading to changes in the demographics of Asia.

The non-military achievements of the Mongol Empire include the introduction of a writing system, a Mongol alphabet based on the characters of the Old Uyghur, which is still used in Mongolia today.

Some of the other long-term consequences of the Mongol Empire include:
 Moscow rose to prominence while it was still under the rule of the Mongol-Tatar yoke, some time after Russian rulers were accorded the status of tax collectors for the Mongols. The fact that the Russians collected tribute and taxes for the Mongols meant that the Mongols themselves rarely visited the lands which they owned. The Russians eventually gained military power, and their ruler Ivan III completely overthrew the Mongols and formed the Russian Tsardom. After the Great Stand on the Ugra River proved that the Mongols were vulnerable, the Grand Duchy of Moscow gained independence.
 Europe's knowledge of the known world was immensely expanded by the information which was brought back to it by ambassadors and merchants. When Columbus sailed in 1492, his mission was to reach Cathay, the land of the Grand Khan in China, and give him a letter from the monarchs Ferdinand II of Aragon and Isabella I of Castile.
 Some studies indicate that the Black Death which devastated Europe in the late 1340s may have traveled from China to Europe along the trade routes of the Mongol Empire. In 1347, the Genoese possessor of Caffa, a great trade emporium on the Crimean Peninsula, came under siege by an army of Mongol warriors under the command of Janibeg. After a protracted siege during which the Mongol army was reportedly withering from disease, they decided to use the infected corpses as a biological weapon. The corpses were catapulted over the city walls, infecting the inhabitants. The Genoese traders fled, transferring the plague via their ships into the south of Europe, from where it rapidly spread. The total number of deaths worldwide from the pandemic is estimated at 75–200 million with up to 50 million deaths in Europe alone.

 Western researcher R. J. Rummel estimated that 30 million people were killed by the Mongol Empire. Other researchers estimate that as many as 80 million people were killed, with 50 million deaths being the middle ground. The population of China fell by half during fifty years of Mongol rule. Before the Mongol invasion, the territories of the Chinese dynasties reportedly had approximately 120 million inhabitants; after the conquest was completed in 1279, the 1300 census reported that China's total population was roughly 60 million. While it is tempting to attribute this major decline in China's population solely to Mongol ferocity, today scholars have mixed opinions about this subject. Scholars such as Frederick W. Mote argue that the wide drop in numbers reflects an administrative failure to keep records rather than a de facto decrease, while others such as Timothy Brook argue that the Mongols reduced much of the south Chinese population, and very debatably the Han Chinese population, to an invisible status through cancellation of the right to passports and denial of the right to direct land ownership. This meant that the Chinese had to depend on and be cared for chiefly by Mongols and Tartars, which also involved recruitment into the Mongol army. Other historians such as William McNeill and David O. Morgan argue that the bubonic plague was the main factor behind China's demographic decline during this period.
 The Islamic world was subjected to massive changes as a result of the Mongol invasions. The population of the Iranian plateau suffered from widespread disease and famine, resulting in the death of up to three-quarters of its population, possibly 10 to 15 million people. Historian Steven Ward estimates that Iran's population did not reach its pre-Mongol levels again until the mid-20th century.
 Mesopotamia, for millennia a showplace and pinnacle of human civilization and achievement, was depopulated and pastoralized, never to resume its previous pre-eminence. In his Outline of History, H.G. Wells attributed this to a Mongol prejudice against urban life:

[I]n this region [Mesopotamia] nomadism really did attempt, and really did to a very considerable degree succeed in its attempt, to stamp a settled civilized system out of existence. When Jengis Khan first invaded China, we are told that there was a serious discussion among the Mongol chiefs whether all the towns and settled populations should not be destroyed. To these simple practitioners of the open-air life the settled populations seemed corrupt, crowded, vicious, effeminate, dangerous, and incomprehensible; a detestable human efflorescence upon what would otherwise have been good pasture. They had no use whatever for the towns. **** But it was only under Hulagu in Mesopotamia that these ideas seem to have been embodied in a deliberate policy. The Mongols here did not only burn and massacre; they destroyed the irrigation system that had endured for at least eight thousand years, and with that the mother civilization of all the Western world came to an end.

 David Nicole states in The Mongol Warlords, "terror and mass extermination of anyone opposing them was a well tested Mongol tactic." About half of the Russian population may have died during the invasion. However, Colin McEvedy in Atlas of World Population History, 1978 estimates the population of Russia-in-Europe dropped from 7.5 million prior to the invasion to 7 million afterward. Historians estimate that up to half of Hungary's two million population were victims of the Mongol invasion. Historian Andrea Peto says that Rogerius, an eyewitness, said that "the Mongols killed everybody regardless of gender or age" and "the Mongols especially 'found pleasure' in humiliating women."
 One of the more successful tactics employed by the Mongols was to wipe out urban populations that refused to surrender. During the Mongol invasion of Rus', almost all major cities were destroyed. If they chose to submit, the people were generally spared, though this was not guaranteed. For example, the city of Hamadan in modern-day Iran was destroyed and every man, woman, and child executed by Mongol general Subadai, after surrendering to him but failing to have enough provisions for his Mongol scouting force. Several days after the initial razing of the city, Subadai sent a force back to the burning ruins and the site of the massacre to kill any inhabitants of the city who had been away at the time of the initial slaughter and had returned in the meantime. Mongol armies made use of local peoples and their soldiers, often incorporating them into their armies. Prisoners of war sometimes were given the choice between death and becoming part of the Mongol army to aid in future conquests. Due to the brutal methods employed to subdue their subjects, Mongols maintained long lasting resentment from those they conquered. This resentment towards the Mongol rule has been highlighted as a cause for the empire's rapid fracturing. In addition to intimidation tactics, the rapid expansion of the empire was facilitated by military hardiness (especially during bitterly cold winters), military skill, meritocracy, and discipline.
 The Kalmyks were the last Mongol nomads to penetrate European territory, having migrated to Europe from Central Asia at the turn of the 17th century. In the winter of 1770–1771, approximately 200,000 Kalmyks began the journey from their pastures on the left bank of the Volga River to Dzungaria, through the territories of their Kazakh and Kyrgyz enemies. After several months of travel, only one-third of the original group reached Dzungaria in northwest China.

See also 
 Mughal-Mongol genealogy
 Tellurocracy
 Xiongnu origin of Mongol
 Destruction under the Mongol Empire
 Mongol dynasty (disambiguation)
 Mongol khanate (disambiguation)
 Göktürk Khaganate
 Mongolization
 List of Mongol states
 List of medieval Mongol tribes and clans

Explanatory notes

References

Citations

General and cited sources

Further reading

General surveys 

 Atwood, Christopher, P. Encyclopedia of Mongolia and the Mongol Empire , New York: Facts on File (2004)
 Bartold, Vasily. Turkestan Down to the Mongol Invasion (Trans. T. Minorsky & C. E. Bosworth), London: Luzac & Co. (1928)
 Bartold, Vasily. Four Studies on Central Asia, vol. 1 (Trans. V. Minorsky and T. Minorsky), Leiden: Brill. (1956)
 The Cambridge History of Inner Asia: The Chinggisid Age, (ed.) Nicola Di Cosmo, Allen J. Frank, Peter B. Golden 
 The Cambridge History of China, vol. 6: Alien Regimes and Border States, 907–1368, (ed.) Herbert Franke, Denis C. Twitchett 
 The Cambridge History of Iran, vol. 5: The Saljuq and Mongol Periods, (ed.) J. A. Boyle 
 Buell, Paul. 'Historical Dictionary of the Mongol World Empire, 1200–1370' 2003
 Howorth, Henry.  History of the Mongols: From the 9th to the 19th Century, part 1. The Mongols proper and the Kalmuks (1876)
 Howorth, Henry.  History of the Mongols: From the 9th to the 19th Century, part 2. The so-called Tartars of Russia and Central Asia, 2 divions (1880)
 Howorth, Henry.  History of the Mongols: From the 9th to the 19th Century, part 3. The Mongols of Persia  (1880)
 Morgan, David.  The Mongols (2007)
 Jackson, Peter.  The Mongols and the Islamic World: From Conquest to Conversion, Yale University Press (2017). isbn 9780300125337

Administration, economy and finance 
 
 Thomas, Allsen. (1989). Mongolian Princes and Their Merchant Partners, 1200-1260. Asia Major, 2(2), third series, 83-126. Retrieved November 3, 2020, from http://www.jstor.org/stable/41645437 
 
 
 Enkhbold, Enerelt. (2019). "The role of the ortoq in the Mongol Empire in forming business partnerships", Central Asian Survey, 38:4, 531-547, DOI: 10.1080/02634937.2019.1652799 
 
 Kim, Hodong. "The Unity of the Mongol Empire and Continental Exchange over Eurasia,"  Journal of Central Eurasian Studies 1 (2009): 15–42.
 
 
 
 
 
 
 
 Schurmann, Herbert. (1956). "Mongolian Tributary Practices of the Thirteenth Century," Harvard Journal of Asiatic Studies, 19(3/4), 304-389. doi:10.2307/2718506 
 Smith, John (1970). "Mongol and Nomadic Taxation," Harvard Journal of Asiatic Studies, 30, 46–85. doi:10.2307/2718765

Culture, arts and science 
 
 
 Biran, Michal (ed.). (2019). Mobility Transformations and Cultural Exchange in Mongol Eurasia, Journal of the Economic and Social History of the Orient 62(2–3). 
   
 
 
 
 “Islamic and Chinese Astronomy under the Mongols: a Little-Known Case of Transmission”, in : Yvonne Dold-Samplonius, Joseph W. Dauben, Menso Folkerts & Benno van Dalen, éds., From China to Paris. 2000 Years Transmission of Mathematical Ideas. Series: Boethius 46, Stuttgart (Steiner), 2002, pp. 327–356.

Institutions 
 Allsen, Thomas T. (1986). Guard and Government in the Reign of The Grand Qan Möngke, 1251–59. Harvard Journal of Asiatic Studies, 46(2), 495–521. doi:10.2307/2719141
 Allsen, Thomas T. (2011). "Imperial Posts, West, East and North: A Review Article: Adam J. Silverstein, Postal Systems in the Pre-Modern Islamic Morld," Archivum Eurasiae Medii Aevi, 17:1, 237–76
 Atwood, Christopher P. "Ulus Emirs, Keshig Elders, Signatures, and Marriage Partners: The Evolution of a Classic Mongol Institution,"  Imperial Statecraft: Political Forms and Techniques of Governance in Inner Asia, Sixth-Twentieth Centuries, (ed.) Sneath, D. (Bellington WA, 2006), pp. 141–174 Google Scholar.
 Jackson, Peter. "YĀSĀ," Encyclopædia Iranica, online edition, 2013, available at Welcome to Encyclopaedia Iranica  (accessed on 20 September 2016)
 Munkuyev, N.Ts. (1977). A NEW MONGOLIAN P'AI-TZŬ FROM SIMFEROPOL. Acta Orientalia Academiae Scientiarum Hungaricae, 31(2), 185–215. Retrieved November 9, 2020, from A NEW MONGOLIAN P'AI-TZŬ FROM SIMFEROPOL 
 Ostrowski, Donald. The tamma and the Dual-Administrative Structure of the Mongol Empire Bulletin of the School of Oriental and African Studies, University of London, vol. 61, no 2, 1998, p. 262–277 doi: 10.1017/S0041977X0001380X
 Vasary, Istvan. (1976). THE GOLDEN HORDE TERM DARUĠA AND ITS SURVIVAL IN RUSSIA. Acta Orientalia Academiae Scientiarum Hungaricae, 30(2), 187–197. Retrieved November 9, 2020, from THE GOLDEN HORDE TERM DARUĠA AND ITS SURVIVAL IN RUSSIA

Biography, society and gender 
 
 Biran, Michal, Jonathan Brack & Francesca Fiaschetti (ed.). Along the Silk Roads in Mongol Eurasia: Generals, Merchants, and Intellectuals. Univ of California Press, 2020
 
 Paul Buell, “Some Royal Mongol Ladies: Alaqa-beki, *Ergene-Qatun and Others,”  World History Connected, 2010

Diplomatic and military 
 Amitai-Preiss, Reuven (1995). Mongols and Mamluks: The Mamluk-Ilkhanid War, 1260–1281 (Cambridge Studies in Islamic Civilization). Cambridge: Cambridge University Press. Mongols and Mamluks: The Mamluk-Ilkhanid War, 1260–1281 
 Dashdondog, Bayarsaikhan (2011). The Mongols and the Armenians (1220–1335). Leiden: Brill. DOI: The Mongols and the Armenians (1220-1335)
 Fiaschetti, Francesca  (ed.). (2019). Diplomacy in the Age of Mongol Globalization, Eurasian Studies 17(2) 
 Halperin, Charles (1988). Russia and The Golden Horde (Pennsylvania: Indiana University Press)
 Henthorn, W. E. (1963). Korea: the Mongol invasions (Leiden: Brill)
 Hsiao, Chi-chi'ng (1978). The Military Establishment of the Yuan Dynasty (Cambridge: Harvard University Press)
 Jackson, Peter. (2005). The Mongols and the West, 1221–1410 (Harlow and New York: Pearson Longman)
 May, Timothy (2007). The Mongol Art of War: Chinggis Khan and the Mongol Military System (Yardley: Westholme Publishing)

External links 
 Genghis Khan and the Mongols
 The Mongol Empire
 Mongols
 The Mongols in World History
 The Mongol Empire for students 
 Paradoxplace Insight Pages on the Mongol Emperors
 William of Rubruck's Account of the Mongols
 Mongol invasion of Rus (pictures)
 Worldwide Death Toll
 
 Mongol Empire Google Earth

 
Former monarchies of East Asia
Former monarchies of North Asia
History of Mongolia
Khanates
Empire
Mongol states
Nomadic groups in Eurasia
States and territories established in 1206
States and territories disestablished in 1368
1368 disestablishments in Asia
1206 establishments in Asia
Former countries in Asia
Former countries in East Asia
Former countries in North Asia
Former countries in Europe
Yuan dynasty
Historical transcontinental empires
Former empires